Töle Biy (also Tole Bi), or Töle Älibekūly (Töle bi Älibekūly) (1663, Köktuma Tract, now Alakol District, Kazakhstan - 1756, Aqburkhan-orda, now Tole Bi District, Kazakh Khanate) was the head biy of the Kazakh senior juz, as well as an author, orator, poet, politician and a public figure.  He was born in Jaysan in what is now Shuy district, Jambyl oblast in 1663.

Biography 

Töle Biy comes from the Kazakh tribe Dulat, subtribe Zhanys, in the family of Alibek Biy. Alibek Biy's father, Qudaiberdy Biy was a Khan adviser of Esim Khan's and took part in the battle "Qataghan Qyrghyny" (lit. "Massacre of the Qataghan") (1627-1628), against the rebellious Khan Tursyn, then ruler of Tashkent. Töle was born in the Koktuma tract, the Alakol District.
In one of his works, Bukhar-zhirau tells about the childhood of Ablai Khan, where he would work for Abilmambet and look afterTöle's sheep. In the "Sabalaq" poem, Bukhar-zhirau writes about dialogues Töle and Ablai would have. Töle Biy even had a nickname for Ablai, "Sabalaq", for his overgrown hair and disheveled appearance. This is a sign that Töle was one of the first people to know "Sabalaq" was a boy with a bright future.

Töle was well-respected for his deep knowledge and wisdom. There is a citation describing Tole: "A wise thought has a source, and its author is spiritual father Maiky". Some believed he gained Maiky Biy's spirit. Töle was often described as the one everyone could rely on, his wisdom was also noted by such zhiraus as Synyr-zhyrau and Zhirenshi.

The wise eloquent words, proverbs and sayings are widespread in the country. Folklorists and historians collected and studied about the life of Tole bi and his role in governing the country. That includes Shoqan Walikhanov, Alexey Lyovshin, Grigory Potanin, Аbubakir Divayev and Baltabai Adambayev, and others. The Manuscripts Fund of the State Archives of Kazakhstan and the Academy of Sciences also contains materials collected from around the country. There is still a lot of Tole biy heritage that has not been written down or collected.

References 

Kazakh-language poets
1663 births
1756 deaths
Kazakh Khanate
Heads of state in Asia